is a Japanese football player currently playing for Yokohama FC.

Career
He plays primarily as a left winger, but likes to cut inside and is capable of playing in a more central role. He is a skillful dribbler capable of beating defenders in one-on-one situations.

Career statistics
Updated to 1 March 2019.

References

External links
Profile at Júbilo Iwata

1988 births
Living people
Association football people from Shizuoka Prefecture
Japanese footballers
J1 League players
J2 League players
Júbilo Iwata players
Avispa Fukuoka players
Yokohama FC players
Association football midfielders